Joos de Moor (1548 or 1558 – 18 February 1618) was a Dutch Vice Admiral of Zeeland from the 16th century. In 1603 in the Battle of Sluis he defeated a Spanish fleet under Admiral Federico Spinola. He was married to Dina Crins (ca. 1562–1583), Janneken Ingels (ca. 1564–1604), and Catarina Struvingts (ca 1563-1613). He died at Vlissingen and is buried in the St James the Great Church.

References
 A.J. van der Aa Joos de Moor in Biographisch woordenboek der Nederlanden. Vol 12. 1869
 A.F. van Beurden, Moor, Joos de in Nieuw Nederlandsch biografisch woordenboek. Vol 9. 1933

1550s births
Year of birth uncertain
1618 deaths
16th-century Dutch people
Dutch people of the Eighty Years' War (United Provinces)
Naval commanders of the Eighty Years' War

People from Vlissingen